Bottler may refer to:

 The Bottler (died 1908), pseudonym of gambler and underworld figure in New York
 Seven-Up Bottlers, or Pepsi Mega Bottlers, former names of the basketball team TNT KaTropa
 Sunkist Orange Bottlers, or Pop Cola Bottlers, former names of the basketball team Pop Cola Panthers
 Bottling company, a company bottles beverages
 A truck type with roll-up side doors specifically designed to bottles and tanks
 A character created by Irish stand-up comedian Brendan Grace
 A British term for the person who collects money at a street performance
A type of water disruptor for explosive disposal; see Bomb disposal

See also 
 Bottle (disambiguation)